2014 The National may refer to one of the following:
2014 The National (March), the Grand Slam held in March 2014 as part of the 2013–14 curling season
2014 The National (November), the Grand Slam to be held in November 2014 as part of the 2014–15 curling season